Geoffrey Edward Blum (born April 26, 1973) is an American former professional baseball infielder in Major League Baseball who played for the Montreal Expos, Houston Astros, Tampa Bay Devil Rays, San Diego Padres, Chicago White Sox and Arizona Diamondbacks. He is currently the TV color analyst for the Houston Astros.

Early life
Before becoming a professional baseball player, he majored in sociology at the University of California, Berkeley and played for the California Golden Bears baseball team. In 1993, he played collegiate summer baseball with the Brewster Whitecaps of the Cape Cod Baseball League and was named a league all-star.

Professional career

Montreal Expos
He began his professional career when he was selected in the seventh round of the  amateur draft by the Montreal Expos. During his time with the Expos, he spent the winter of 1995 in the Australian Baseball League with the Hunter Eagles.

Houston Astros
On March 12, 2002, after playing in Montreal for three years, he was traded to the Houston Astros in exchange for Chris Truby.

Tampa Bay Devil Rays
He was then traded after the 2003 season to Tampa Bay Devil Rays in exchange for Brandon Backe.  In 2004, he batted only .215 for the Devil Rays, with a .266 on-base percentage.

San Diego Padres
Blum signed with the San Diego Padres as a free agent on December 9, 2004. He hit .241 in 78 games for the Padres in 2005.

Chicago White Sox
He was traded to the Chicago White Sox for a minor leaguer on July 31, 2005.

On October 25, 2005, Blum hit a home run against the Astros at Minute Maid Park in the top of the 14th inning that served as the go-ahead run in the eventual victory for the Sox in Game 3 of the World Series. 

On April 11, 2008 a monument celebrating the 2005 World Series was unveiled at U.S. Cellular Field in Chicago, featuring bronze statues of five players. Blum is one of them, commemorating his tie-breaking home run. The home run would forever cement his place in White Sox history.

San Diego Padres
He returned to the Padres as a free agent in 2006.

Houston Astros
On November 20, 2007, Blum signed a $1.1 million, one-year contract with the Houston Astros. The deal also included a club option for 2009.

Blum returned to the Astros in 2009 and played mostly 3B for Houston. He hit 10 home runs that season, drove in 49 runs and was known for playing excellent defense at all the infield positions.

On October 30, 2009, Blum re-signed with the Astros. The contract was worth $1.5 million for the 2010 season and included a mutual option for 2011, which would be worth $1.65 million that was declined, making him a free agent.

Blum suffered a season-ending injury to his elbow in July 2010 while putting on his shirt after a game. He had this to say: "There are probably 90 percent of us in the big leagues that have loose bodies floating around. It just so happens that after the game, it tightened up on me. The shirt had nothing to do with the damn injury."

Arizona Diamondbacks
On November 15, 2010, Blum signed a two-year contract worth $2.7 million with the Arizona Diamondbacks. In 2 years with the Diamondbacks, he appeared in a total of 40 games out of 326 possible games due to injury. He was released by the Diamondbacks on July 20, 2012.

Broadcasting career
On January 12, 2013, he was named a color analyst of the Houston Astros for Comcast SportsNet Houston, where he worked with Bill Brown and Alan Ashby. In 2017, he was teamed with a new play-by-play man in Todd Kalas. Blum and Kalas have served as broadcast partners for the Astros (under AT&T SportsNet Southwest) since 2017.

He resides in Houston, Texas.

References

External links

Official website

1973 births
Living people
American expatriate baseball players in Canada
Arizona Diamondbacks players
Arizona League Diamondbacks players
Baseball players from California
California Golden Bears baseball players
Chicago White Sox players
Corpus Christi Hooks players
Gulf Coast Expos players
Harrisburg Senators players
Houston Astros announcers
Houston Astros players
Jupiter Hammerheads players
Lake Elsinore Storm players
Major League Baseball third basemen
Montreal Expos players
Ottawa Lynx players
People from Redwood City, California
Reno Aces players
Round Rock Express players
San Diego Padres players
Tampa Bay Devil Rays players
Vermont Expos players
Visalia Rawhide players
West Palm Beach Expos players
Brewster Whitecaps players
Mat-Su Miners players